Ulice jak stygmaty – absolutne rarytasy – Pidzama Porno's sixth album, released in 1999 by S.P. Records. This CD contains new versions of old Pidzama's songs, also some songs which had not been written by Grabaż – "Nimfy (Baby)" by the words of Anatol Stern, "Dłoń, która podpisała papier" – by the words of Dylan Thomas (translated by poet Stanisław Barańczak) and "Outsider" – a song originally made by T.Love, written by Muniek Staszczyk, personally a friend of Krzysztof "Grabaz" Grabowski. The album was recorded in Studio CZAD in Swarzedz.

Track listing

Videos
"Katarzyna ma katar"
"Outsider"

The band
Krzysztof "Grabaż" Grabowski – vocal
Andrzej "Kozak" Kozakiewicz – guitar, vocal on track 13
Sławek "Dziadek" Mizerkiewicz – guitar
Julian "Julo" Piotrowiak – bass guitar
Rafał "Kuzyn" Piotrowiak – drums

and also:
Ropuch – guitar
Jacek Kortylewicz – tube
Piotr "Malina" Maliński – klarnet

References
http://pidzamaporno.art.pl/?p=plyta&id=9

Pidżama Porno albums
1999 albums